The Field Elm cultivar Ulmus minor 'Pendula' was said to have been raised in Belgium in 1863. It was listed as Ulmus sativa pendula by C. de Vos in 1887, and by Boom in 1959 as a cultivar.

Herbarium specimens confirm that more than one field elm clone has been distributed as 'Pendula'. Henry (1913) distinguished "the true var. pendula", with its "dense crown of foliage", from a cultivar Kew called U. glabra Mill. pendula nova, "a common form of [field elm] with drooping branches". The van Houtte nursery of Ghent distributed an U. campestris pendula from the 1880s, as did various English nurseries, while Späth's of Berlin marketed a small-leaved U. campestris suberosa pendula Hort. from the 1890s.

Krüssman (1984) equated U. minor 'Pendula' with an U. campestris wentworthii, confusing it with the hybrid Wentworth Weeping Elm.

Description 
The tree has slender pendulous branches, with leaves "smooth and glossy above and strongly glandular beneath, with orange-brown sessile glands". Bean described 'Pendula' as "very vigorous and large-leaved". Green reported that the young twigs are prone to dieback in hard winters.

Henry noted a peculiar feature on outer lower branches of the Kew and Cambridge Botanics specimens – "one or two small supernumerary leaflets at the base of leaves" – a feature visible on Cambridge and Maastricht  herbarium specimens. "Other leaves," he added, "are large and broad, as if composed of two ordinary leaves" and "often cleft from apex to base".

Pests and diseases 
'Pendula' is susceptible to Dutch elm disease.

Cultivation 
'Pendula' was included in many European botanical collections in the late 19th and early 20th C. It is present in Australasia, its leaves matching old European herbarium specimens labelled U. campestris pendula. U. campestris pendula was introduced to North America, where it featured in the 1902 catalogue of the Bobbink and Atkins nursery, Rutherford, New Jersey, as 'Small-leaved English weeping elm'. The tree listed and illustrated in Bobbink and Atkins' 1909 catalogue as U. campestris microphylla pendula, 'English Weeping Elm' is not the European 'Microphylla Pendula', which has much smaller leaves, but was probably the same cultivar as the nursery's 1902 U. campestris pendula. An U. foliacea pendula was present in the New York Botanical Garden in the early 20th century. A 'Pendula', much trimmed, is present in Brighton, UK.

Notable trees 
A tree in the Cambridge University Botanic Garden from the late 19th to mid 20th C, grafted high on English Elm stock and originally listed as U. nitens, was identified as 'Pendula' by Stearn in 1932. It survived the first DED epidemic, its crown removed after dieback in the late 1940s, and had attained a trunk diameter of 3 ft. by 1962, when it was confirmed as U. carpinifolia Gled. var. 'Pendula' by P. F. Yeo. A notable specimen, planted in 1898, stood in the Snouck van Loosenpark, Enkhuizen, the Netherlands, until it was blown down in 2015. Eight old 'Pendula' line Mulwaree Street, Goulburn, New South Wales, Australia, their leaves matching the commonest 20th-century European 'Pendula' clone. The form of the sucker-trees growing around them confirms that the original trees were propagated vegetatively.

Synonymy 

U. nitens var. pendula Rehder
U. glabra Mill. pendula
U. carpinifolia Gled. var. 'Pendula'

Accessions

Europe 
Royal Botanic Gardens Kew, UK. Acc. no. 1973-11710 (as U. carpinifolia var. pendula).
Grange Farm Arboretum, Lincolnshire, UK. Acc. no. 1136.

Australasia 
Eastwoodhill Arboretum , Gisborne, New Zealand, 4 trees, acc. details not known.

Nurseries

Europe 
Arboretum Waasland , Nieuwkerken-Waas, Belgium. As U. carpinifolia 'Pendula'.

References

External links 
 "Herbarium specimen BR0000010841044". Botanic Garden, Meise. Sheet labelled U. campestris pendula (1904 specimen)
  Sheet described as "U. glabra Mill. f. pendula " [ = U. minor 'Pendula' ]
  Sheet described as "U. carpinifolia Gled. f. 'Pendula' " (Wageningen Arboretum specimen)
  Sheet described as "U. carpinifolia Gled. f. 'Pendula' "
  Sheet described as "U. carpinifolia Gled. f. 'Pendula' " (with samarae)
  Sheet labelled Ulmus pendula, Maastricht Park specimen, showing supernumerary leaves (1913)
  Sheet labelled U. nitens pendula, Cambridge specimen, showing supernumerary leaves; not 'Smithii'
 "Herbarium specimen 295076, herbariaunited.org Sheet labelled U. campestris glabra pendula nova, Kew Gardens specimen, A. Ley (1911)

Field elm cultivar
Ulmus articles with images
Ulmus